McKenzie Lake is a lake in geographic Speight Township in the Unorganized West Part of Timiskaming District in northeastern Ontario, Canada.

The lake has two unnamed inflows: one at the south, arriving from Harebell Lake, and one at the west. The primary outflow is an unnamed creek at the north which flows via Spray Creek, Spring Creek, the Montreal River and the Ottawa River to the Saint Lawrence River.

See also
List of lakes in Ontario

References

Lakes of Timiskaming District